or  refers to both the Japanese genre of  music originating from Tsugaru Peninsula in present-day Aomori Prefecture and the instrument it is performed with. It is performed throughout Japan, though associations with the Tsugaru remain strong.   is considered the most recognized genre of  music, and has enjoyed multiple periods of popularity in Japan.

History
What is known is that  originated from a small peninsula due west of present-day Aomori Prefecture called Tsugaru. In addition, some researchers have conjectured on the style's origins based on available evidence. There is some consensus that the style was developed by homeless and blind individuals called .

One scholar, Daijō Kazuo, proposed that the genre originated from a  named Nitabō on the basis of interviews of musicians and their families. Nitabō rounded off the plectrum of the instrument such that it was shaped like a rice paddle. In addition, he adopted a playing style with the  held upright, included the area around the bridge as the playing area, and incorporated beating and slapping the strings in contrast to exclusive use of the plectrum. However, other scholars, such as Gerald Groemer, argue that due to a lack of documentation, the account advanced by Kazuo may not be entirely accurate.

Nitabō had multiple blind students, such as Kinobo and Chōsakubo, who contributed to the development of the style.  Nitabō's last student, Shirakawa Gunpachirō, performed outside of the Tsugaru region as a part of a folk performance troupe.  Gunpachirō also performed in professional settings, such as in concert halls in Tokyo. As a result of his successes,  became popular in the 1920s, but its popularity waned with the onset of the Second Sino-Japanese War later in the decade.

During 1955–1965, many performers of the genre moved to urban centers in Japan such as Tokyo. This migration was part of a larger movement due to a boom in the traditional arts in Japan.  enjoyed another bout of popularity when Gunpachirō performed with  star Michiya Mihashi at the Nihon Theater in Tokyo in 1959. As a result of this mass exposure to the genre, younger practitioners of the genre began to emerge.

Composition

 is played on a larger  called  with a thicker neck and thicker strings than those used for most other styles.  is easy to recognize by its percussive quality (the plectrum striking the body of the instrument on each stroke) and the lilt of the rhythms performed. Unlike most other Japanese music, some  pieces are in triple time, though the three beats are not accentuated in the manner of Western music.

 has a large and steadily growing repertory. Interviews with noted performers such as Takahashi Chikuzan and Yamada Chisato and recordings issued by stars of the past allow one to produce the following table. Recently, younger performers have been attempting to combine  playing styles or motives with jazz, rock, and other forms of more commercial music.

The  repertoire
A. 
, now rarely played
, now rarely played
B. 

C. 

D. 

Others
E. 
 (composed in 1932 by the singer Narita Unchiku (1888–1974))
 (composed by Narita Unchiku in 1954)
Others
F. : potentially all songs of B, C, D, and E (most commonly B), as well as free improvisation, freely entitled by performers.
 (Takahashi Chikuzan)
 (Yamada Chisato)
Others,  etc.
G.

Playing method
The  is characterized by many distinct phrases and styles. In acrobatic technique, improvising is the feature. They use only left index and ring finger traditionally, and the scale is basically pentatonic (do re mi sol la). A technique unique to the  style in recent years is the tremolo played with the back of the  without hitting the skin.

Discussion of the repertoire
At the start of the 20th century, these  were gradually displaced by shorter non-narrative songs. The  (and, in time, other performers) tended to concentrate their efforts on some five favorite songs (Group C). By the middle of the 20th century three songs (Group B) and their  versions had become the core of the  repertoire, which they remain today. Indeed, ""—in a version that the old  would probably not even recognize—has today become virtually a symbol of the timeless "spirit of Tsugaru".

The songs of group D—though no less traditional than those of groups A, B, and C—were not, it seems, a major part of the  repertoire.  Instead, they tended to be sung by non-professionals, generally without  accompaniment.  But with the  "boom" after World War II, these songs began to receive renewed attention.   accompaniments were composed or arranged by such performers as Takahashi Chikuzan (Takahashi 1976:142).  Somewhat earlier there had been a nationwide movement to produce "new folk songs" (see Hughes 1985:144-54, 281–309; Kojima 1970), resulting in the songs listed in Group E.  More recently still, solo  versions of the songs of Group D have been arranged.  Solo versions of the older songs have become the center of the repertoire, leading to the development of long solo improvisations (Group F) and ensemble playing (Group G).

One of the most the interesting characteristics of the  repertoire is what might be termed its cumulative nature.  As can be seen from the listing of songs in Group B, newer variants of songs tend to coexist alongside older versions, rather than replacing them.  Although the older songs and their  accompaniments or  solo versions have no doubt themselves been somewhat transformed from what they were many decades ago (and they of course were never an entirely uniform to begin with), it remains certain that the "old", "middle", and "new" versions are differentiated not merely stylistically but also historically.  Their structural differences contain, as it were, a congealed history.

Notable players
Yoshida Brothers
Shirakawa Gunpachirō
Takahashi Chikuzan
Kida Rinshōe
Fukushi Masakatsu
Oyama Mitsugu
Mihashi Michiya
Yamada Chisato
Shibutani Kazuo
Hiromitsu Agatsuma
Shin'ichi Kinoshita
Michihiro Sato
Kevin Kmetz
Masahiro Nitta
Mike Penny
Mitsuou Oyama
Mitsugu Oyama
Yutaka Oyama
Shamimater Shishido(Kouzan Oyama)
Yoshikazu Oyama
Seiyu Oyama
Nitta Oyako
Chie Hanawa
Norm Nakamura
Ki&Ki – Kanami and Hikari
Beni Ninagawa (Wagakki Band)
Shinobu Kawashima
Noriko Tadano

Main style
Oyama Ryu
Sawada Ryu

References

Citations

Bibliography

References and further reading
Daijō Kazuo
Daijō has spent most of his life studying  The  and has met many of the old .  His writings, often in semi-novelistic form, emphasize that everything originated with one "".  Most scholars reject this unilinear derivation of the genre.
1984  .  Gōdō Shuppan.
1986  "". In  (6 cassettes and book). Tokyo: King Records K25H-5274-8.
1995   .  Tokyo Shin'yosha.

Groemer, Gerald
1991  The Autobiography of Takahashi Chikuzan: Adventures of a Tsugaru-jamisen musician.  Warren Michigan: Harmonie Park Press.
1993  "." Tōyō ongaku kenkyū 57:41–61.
1999  The Spirit of Tsugaru: Blind Musicians, Takahashi Chikuzan, and the Folk Music of Northern Japan.  Warren, Michigan: Harmonie Park Press. 321 pp., illust., biblio.
2012   The Spirit of Tsugaru: Blind Musicians, Takahashi Chikuzan, and the Folk Music of Northern Japan, 2nd revised edition. Hirosaki: Tsugaru Shobō. 369 pp., illust., photographs, biblio.
The new edition includes a good deal of newly discovered historical information and brings the volume up to date. Includes a translation of Takahashi Chikuzan's autobiography (Takahashi 1976)

Hughes, David
1985  The Heart's Home Town: Traditional Folk Song in Modern  Japan.  PhD dissertation, University of Michigan.
(introduction to Japanese folk song in general).

Johnson, Henry
2010  The : Tradition and diversity. Leiden/Boston: Brill. 

Kimura Genzō
1974  " (1–24)", Tōō Nippō,  Oct.16-Dec.14.

Kojima Tomiko
1970  "". Engekigaku 11:1–29.
(Study of the "new folk song" movement)

Matsuno Takeo
1935  "". Kyōdo-shi Mutsu 1:90–118; 3:115–157; 4:93–112.

Suda Naoyuki and Anthony Rausch
1998 The Birth of Tsugaru Shamisen Music. Aomori: Aomori University Press.
(Abridged translation of Daijō 1995 and includes some more general anthropological material).

Takahashi Chikuzan
1973   (liner notes). Tokyo: CBS Sony SODL 17.
1976  . Tokyo: Shinshokan.
(Autobiography of one of the  greats of the past.  Translated in Groemer 1991, 1999, and 2012).

External links
Bachido: International  Community
Kouzan Oyama: All about 

Japanese folk music
String instruments
Japanese musical instruments
Japanese words and phrases
Shamisen